Sainte-Hélène-de-Kamouraska is a municipality in the Canadian province of Quebec, located in the Kamouraska Regional County Municipality.

Until September 13, 2014, it was officially known simply as Sainte-Hélène.

Municipal council
 Mayor: Vacancy
 Councillors: Blaise Bérubé, Daniel Lajoie, Jacques Laplante, Joël Moreau, Jacques St-Pierre, plus a vacancy

See also
 List of municipalities in Quebec

References

External links
 

Municipalities in Quebec
Incorporated places in Bas-Saint-Laurent